The 2019 All-SEC football team consists of American football players selected to the All-Southeastern Conference (SEC) chosen by the Associated Press (AP) and the conference coaches for the 2019 Southeastern Conference football season.

LSU won the conference, beating Georgia 37–10 in the SEC Championship.

LSU quarterback Joe Burrow was voted the AP SEC Offensive Player of the Year. Auburn defensive tackle Derrick Brown was voted the AP SEC Defensive Player of the Year.

Offensive selections

Quarterbacks
Joe Burrow, LSU (AP-1, Coaches-1)
Tua Tagovailoa, Alabama (AP-2, Coaches-2)

Running backs
Clyde Edwards-Helaire, LSU (AP-1, Coaches-1)
Kylin Hill, Miss St (AP-1, Coaches-2)
D'Andre Swift, Georgia (AP-2, Coaches-1)
Najee Harris, Alabama (AP-2, Coaches-2)

Wide receivers
Ja'Marr Chase, LSU (AP-1, Coaches-1)
Jerry Jeudy, Alabama (AP-2, Coaches-1)
DeVonta Smith, Alabama (AP-1, Coaches-2)
Justin Jefferson, LSU (AP-2)
Bryan Edwards, South Carolina (Coaches-2)

Centers
Lloyd Cushenberry, LSU (Coaches-1)
Drake Jackson, Kentucky (AP-1)
Landon Dickerson, Alabama (Coaches-2)
Trey Hill, Georgia (AP-2)

Guards
Trey Smith, Tennessee (AP-1, Coaches-1)
Logan Stenberg, Kentucky (AP-1, Coaches-2)
Landon Dickerson, Alabama (AP-2)
Damien Lewis, LSU (AP-2, Coaches-2)

Tackles
Andrew Thomas, Georgia (AP-1, Coaches-1)
Jedrick Wills Jr., Alabama (AP-1, Coaches-1)
Alex Leatherwood, Alabama (AP-2, Coaches-1)
Adrian Magee, LSU (Coaches-2)
Prince Tega Wanogho, Auburn (Coaches-2)
Isaiah Wilson, Georgia (AP-2)

Tight ends
Kyle Pitts, Florida (AP-1, Coaches-1)
Albert Okwuegbunam, Missouri (Coaches-2)
Jalen Wydermyer, Texas A&M (AP-2)

Defensive selections

Defensive ends
Marlon Davidson, Auburn (AP-1, Coaches-1)
Jonathan Greenard, Florida (AP-1, Coaches-1)
Raekwon Davis, Alabama (Coaches-2)
Chauncey Rivers, Miss St (AP-2)
D. J. Wonnum, South Carolina (AP-2)

Defensive tackles
Derrick Brown, Auburn (AP-1, Coaches-1)
Jordan Elliott, Missouri (AP-1)
Javon Kinlaw, South Carolina (AP-2, Coaches-1)
Tyler Clark, Georgia (Coaches-2)
Benito Jones, Ole Miss (Coaches-2)
Rashard Lawrence, LSU (Coaches-2)
Justin Madubuike, Texas A&M (AP-2)

Linebackers
Nick Bolton, Missouri (AP-1, Coaches-1)
Anfernee Jennings, Alabama (AP-1, Coaches-1)
K. J. Britt, Auburn (AP-1; Coaches-2)
K'Lavon Chaisson, LSU (AP-2, Coaches-1)
Daniel Bituli, Tennessee (Coaches-2)
De'Jon Harris, Arkansas (AP-2)
Terrell Lewis, Alabama (Coaches-2)
David Reese, Florida (AP-2)
Monty Rice, Georgia (AP-2)

Cornerbacks
Trevon Diggs, Alabama (AP-1; Coaches-2)
C. J. Henderson, Florida (Coaches-1)
Derek Stingley Jr., LSU (AP-1; Coaches-2)
Israel Mukuamu, South Carolina (AP-2)
Kristian Fulton, LSU (AP-2)
Eric Stokes, Georgia (AP-2)

Safeties
Xavier McKinney, Alabama (AP-1, Coaches-1)
Grant Delpit, LSU (AP-2, Coaches-1)
Nigel Warrior, Tennessee (AP-1, Coaches-2)
J. R. Reed, Georgia (Coaches-1)
Jeremiah Dinson, Auburn (AP-2)
JaCoby Stevens, LSU (Coaches-2)

Special teams

Kickers
Rodrigo Blankenship, Georgia (AP-1, Coaches-1)
Brent Cimaglia, Tennessee (Coaches-2)
Cade York, LSU (AP-2)

Punters
Max Duffy, Kentucky (AP-1, Coaches-2)
Braden Mann, Texas A&M (AP-2, Coaches-1)

All purpose/return specialist
Lynn Bowden, Kentucky (AP-1, Coaches-1)
Jaylen Waddle, Alabama (AP-2, Coaches-1)
Jerrion Ealy, Ole Miss (Coaches-2)
Treylon Burks, Arkansas (Coaches-2)
Clyde Edwards-Helaire, LSU (Coaches-2)
Christian Tutt, Auburn (Coaches-2)
Marquez Callaway, Tennessee (Coaches-2)

Key

See also
2019 Southeastern Conference football season
2019 College Football All-America Team

References

All-Southeastern Conference
All-SEC football teams